Countdown, in comics, may refer to:

 Countdown (Polystyle Publications), a British boys comic of the early 1970s
 Countdown to Final Crisis, a DC comics series
 DC Countdown, the name originally listed for Countdown to Infinite Crisis

See also
Countdown (disambiguation)